If You Ever See an Owl... is the first album by The Terrible Twos, a children's music alter-ego of The New Amsterdams.

History
In 2005 after The Get Up Kids split up, lead singer Matt Pryor turned his focus on his other band The New Amsterdams and, primarily, his children. The main reason The Get Up Kids split up was due to Pryor's disenfranchisement with touring, and his desire to spend more time with his children. As he spent more time with them, he began writing children's songs. Eventually, he showed them to his bandmates, and they decided to perform them. Pryor's goal was to create music that would engage children, but entertain their parents as well. Eventually, they recorded their first album, If You Ever See an Owl.... After the album was complete, however, it was not released immediately due to the band members focusing on The New Amsterdams. Alongside this, they wanted artist and friend Travis Millard to illustrate a storybook to be packaged with the album. Finally, in 2005 the album was released independently, then re-released on Vagrant Records in 2007.

Track listing

Personnel

Band
Matt Pryor – Vocals, guitar, engineering
Bill Belzer – Drums
Eric McCann – Upright bass
Dustin Kinsey – Guitar
Zach Holland – Keyboard

Production
Alex Brahl – Engineering
Michael Fossenkemper – Mastering
Colin Mahoney – Mixing

Design
Travis Millard – Artwork, packaging

References

Matt Pryor (musician) albums
Vagrant Records albums
2007 albums